Oberon Dam or Fish River Dam is a major ungated concrete slab and buttress with earth embankment dam comprising a concrete ski jump chute spillway and fuse plug across the Fish River upstream of Oberon in the Central Tablelands region of New South Wales, Australia. The dam's purpose includes flood mitigation, industrial, and water supply. The impounded reservoir is called Lake Oberon.

Location and features
The dam was built by the NSW Department of Public Works on behalf of the New South Wales Department of Land and Water Conservation. The original intent of the works was to supply water to the National Oil Proprietary Ltd's refinery at Glen Davis in the western coal fields, factories at Lithgow, and supporting populations. Water from Oberon Dam feeds the Fish River Water Supply, which is a unique regional water supply scheme and is the only scheme in eastern Australia to transfer western flowing water to areas east of the Great Dividing Range.

The concrete ski jump chute and fuse plug spillways are capable of discharging .

Oberon Dam provides a bulk water supply to Oberon Shire, Lithgow City Council and Sydney Catchment Authority as well as to the power stations owned and operated by EnergyAustralia.

Recreation
The reservoir is regularly stocked with brown and rainbow trout and can be fished throughout the year from the water's edge. On the reservoir's northern shore toilets and picnic facilities are available.

See also

 List of dams and reservoirs in New South Wales

References

External links
 

Dams in New South Wales
Dams completed in 1959
Central Tablelands
Embankment dams
Oberon Council